Mercedes-Benz has sold a number of automobiles with the "230" model name:
 1937–1941 W143
 1937–1941 Typ 230 n / 230
 1963–1966 W113
 1963–1966 230SL
 1965–1968 W110
 1965–1968 230
 1965–1968 W111
 1965–1968 230S
 1968–1972 W114
 1968–1972 230.6
 1973–1976 W115
 1973–1976 230.4
 1976–1986 W123
 1976–1986 230 / 230E / 230C / 230CE / 230T / 230TE
 1985–1993 W124
 1985–1993 230E / 230CE / 230TE
 1997 R170
 1997 SLK230
 1998 W202
 1998 C230

Mercedes-Benz 230 (displayed at ADIPEC 2013)

230